Chrislain Iris Aurel Matsima (born 15 May 2002) is a French professional footballer who plays as a defender for  club Monaco.

Club career 
Matsima made his professional debut for AS Monaco FC on 27 September 2020 in a Ligue 1 game against RC Strasbourg.

On 16 August 2022, Matsima joined Lorient on loan with an option to buy. On 31 January 2023, the loan was terminated early.

Personal life
Born in France, Matsima is of Congolese (Congo-Brazzaville) descent.

References

External links

Profile at the AS Monaco FC website

2002 births
Living people
People from Nanterre
French footballers
France youth international footballers
Association football defenders
AS Monaco FC players
FC Lorient players
Ligue 1 players
Championnat National 2 players
French sportspeople of Republic of the Congo descent
Footballers from Hauts-de-Seine